There are several notable research and academic institutes, centers and facilities associated with the University of Nevada, Reno.

Centers, Institutes & Facilities
Academy for the Environment
Applied Research Facility
Arthur Brant Laboratory for Exploration Geophysics
Bridge Research and Information Center
Candida Adherence Mycology Research Unit
Center for the Application of Substance Abuse Technologies
Center for Basque Studies
Center for Civil Engineering Earthquake Research
Center for Economic Development
Center for Environmental Arts and Humanities
Center for Environmental Sciences & Engineering
Center for Holocaust, Genocide and Peace Studies
Center for Learning and Literacy
Center for Logistics Management
Center for Neotectonic Studies
Center for Research Design and Analysis (CRDA)
Center for Research in Economic Geology
Center of Biomedical Research Excellence
The Collaboratory for Computational Geosciences
Conservation Genetics Center
Great Basin Center for Geothermal Energy
Great Basin Institute
Grant Sawyer Center for Justice Studies
Institute for Innovation and Informatics
Institute for the Study of Gambling and Commercial Gaming
Latino Research Center
Materials Characterization Nevada
Mining Life-Cycle Center
Nevada Agricultural Experiment Station
Nevada Bureau of Mines and Geology
Nevada Center for Ethics & Health Policy
Nevada Genomics Center
Nevada Institute for Sustainability
Nevada Seismological Laboratory
Nevada Space Grant
Nevada Terawatt Facility
Nevada Training Partnership
Nevada Transgenic Center
Oral History Program
Photon Ion Research Facility
Raggio Research Center
Research & Educational Planning Center
Sanford Center for Aging
University Center for Excellence in Development Disabilities
W. M. Keck Earth Sciences and Mining Research Information Center

University of Nevada, Reno